Ai Weiren (1932 – 29 June 2018) was a lieutenant general of the Chinese People's Liberation Army. He fought in the Chinese Civil War and the Korean War, and served as Deputy Political Commissar of the Chengdu Military Region and of the Shenyang Military Region.

Biography 
Ai was born in Haicheng, Liaoning Province. He enlisted in the People's Liberation Army in March 1948 and joined the Chinese Communist Party in May 1949.  He fought in the Liaoshen Campaign, Western Hubei Campaign, and the Southwest Campaign during the Chinese Civil War, as well as the Korean War after the establishment of the People's Republic of China.

Ai rose through the ranks and served as Deputy Political Commissar of the Chengdu Military Region and of the Shenyang Military Region, He was awarded the rank of major general in 1988, and was promoted to lieutenant general in 1990. He was a member of the 13th National Congress of the Chinese Communist Party, and a member of the 14th Central Commission for Discipline Inspection.

Ai died in Shenyang, Liaoning on 29 June 2018, at the age of 86.

References 

1932 births
2018 deaths
People from Haicheng, Liaoning
People's Liberation Army generals from Liaoning
Chinese military personnel of the Korean War